Vigo is a comarca in the Galician province of Pontevedra, Spain. It covers an area of 613.4 sq.km, centred on the city of Vigo, and the overall population of this comarca was 423,825 at the 2011 Census; the latest official estimate (for the start of 2019) was 424,765.

The comarca is formed from the following 11 municipalities:

References

Comarcas of the Province of Pontevedra